Majdal Anjar (also transliterated Majdel Anjar) is a village of Beqaa Governorate, Lebanon. Majdal Anjar is an overwhelmingly Sunni Muslim town.

History
In 1838, Eli Smith noted  Mejdel 'Anjar   as a Sunni Muslim village in the Beqaa Valley.

Geography
Majdal Anjar is one of  the Bekaa Valley towns of the east. It is located on the international road linking Beirut and Damascus. It is exactly located at the borders of Lebanon and Syria which is referred to the  "Masnaa". About 55 km from the Capital of Lebanon and 57 kilometers from Damascus. Rise of 970 m above sea level. An area of 25,642,775 square meters. A population of about 25,000 people. It borders Sawiri from east and south, Anjar from north and Dakwi and Rawda from west. Each year this village grows more expand towards the north side.

Agriculture
The most important crops are cereals, including: wheat, barley, lentil, grapes, potatoes, beets, nuts, peaches apricots, cherry, pomegranate, almonds, olives, raspberries, apples, onions, tomatoes, zucchini, cabbage, cauliflower, watermelon, lettuce, radishes, parsley, Mint, garlic, beans, kidney beans, etc.

Industry
Nothing more than a simple primitive industry, and food industry, including bread, sugar, flour, and the construction industry. A sugar factory was founded in 1958 in Majdal Anjar, and that was an important turning point in terms of leading to the evolution of this remarkable plant in the cultivation of sugar beets and  the sugar industry.

Trade
The town of Majdal Anjar, is significant, as it is a complex interaction between Lebanon and the Arab states, making it a remarkable trade center in Bekaa. There are many custom offices along the border region, as well as the numerous shops and markets located along the international road. This prompts trade, plants industry, clothing,  electronic parts importer, antiques, and so much more.

Tourism
The castle of the town has attracted many tourists throughout the years, Arabs and foreigners, in addition to the arranged school trips from various regions of Lebanon.

History
Majdal Anjar has a great significance in the old history since it is located at the entrance of the city of Damascus and what surrounds it (valley and mountain-walled great hills).

The town contains an old mosque called "Omar bin al-Khattab," built by Walid bin Abdul Malik bin Marwan. Majdal Anjar is famous by its ancient cathedral, called today "the castle" and located on the flat plateau called "Al Hosen".

Archaeology
He identified a Heavy Neolithic assemblage of the Qaraoun culture that consisted of chisels, axes cores and other debris.

Lorraine Copeland commented that "sackfulls" of neolithic flints could be recovered from the area when she visited, including large cutting tools. The tell shows considerable deposits with finds consisting of pottery sherds, flints and part of a stoneware bowl. Also found were scapers, burins, trapezoidal axes and segmented sickles with fine denticulation. Pottery was both fine and coarse featuring red washing, burnishing and incisions. Finds were similar to middle neolithic levels of Byblos and Ard Tlaili.

References

Bibliography

External links

Majdel Aanjar, localiban

  

Populated places in Zahlé District
Sunni Muslim communities in Lebanon
Neolithic settlements
Archaeological sites in Lebanon